The common name rock daisy may be applied to plants in any of several genera in the family Asteraceae, including:

Brachyscome
Pachystegia
Perityle

Asteraceae